Joveyn County is in Razavi Khorasan province, Iran. The capital of the county is the city of Neqab. At the 2006 census, the region's population (as Joveyn District of Sabzevar County) was 49,583 in 12,982 households. The following census in 2011 counted 54,139 people in 15,400 households, by which time the district had been separated from the county to form Joveyn County. At the 2016 census, the county's population was 54,488 in 16,738 households.

Administrative divisions

The population history and structural changes of Joveyn County's administrative divisions over three consecutive censuses are shown in the following table. The latest census shows two districts, four rural districts, and one city.

References

 

Counties of Razavi Khorasan Province